Parrhasius of Ephesus was one of the greatest painters of Ancient Greece.

Life
Born to the painter Evenor, he settled in Athens. The period of his activity is fixed by the anecdote which Xenophon records of the conversation between him and Socrates on the subject of art; he was therefore distinguished as a painter before 399 BC. Seneca relates a tale that Parrhasius bought one of the Olynthians whom Philip sold into slavery, 346 BC, and tortured him in order to have a model for a picture of the bound Prometheus for the Parthenon in Athens; but the story, which is similar to one told of Michelangelo, is chronologically impossible.

Contest with Zeuxis
Pliny the Elder described Parrhasius's contest with Zeuxis in his book Naturalis Historia: The latter painted some grapes so perfectly that a flock of birds flew down to eat them but, instead, only pecked at their picture. Zeuxis had fooled the birds with his picture. Parrhasius and Zeuxis walked to Parrhasius's studio whereupon Parrhasius asked Zeuxis to draw aside the curtain and witness his own masterpiece. When Zeuxis attempted to do so, he realized that the curtain was not a curtain, but a painting of a curtain. Zeuxis  acknowledged himself to be surpassed, for while Zeuxis had deceived the birds, Parrhasius had deceived Zeuxis. This one of the earliest examples mentioned of the idea of trompe-l'œil.

Legacy
Parrhasius was universally placed in the very first rank among painters. His skillful drawing of outlines is especially praised, and many of his drawings on wood and parchment were preserved and highly valued by later painters for purposes of study. He first attained skill in making his figures appear to stand out from the background. His picture of Theseus adorned the Capitol in Rome. His other works, besides the obscene subjects with which he is said to have amused his leisure, are chiefly mythological groups. A picture of the Demos, the personified People of Athens, is famous; according to the story, which is probably based upon epigrams, the twelve prominent characteristics of the people, though apparently quite inconsistent with each other, were distinctly expressed in this figure.

Parrhasius is commemorated in the scientific name of a species of Australian lizard, Lygisaurus parrhasius, the fire-tailed rainbow-skink.

Sources

References

Ancient Ephesians
Metics in Classical Athens
Ancient Greek painters
Trompe-l'œil artists
5th-century BC painters